The 2012–13 PFF League was the 9th season of the second tier of Pakistan's football league system. The season started on 13 November 2012 and concluded on 21 December 2012.

Departmental Leg

Group A

Group B

Group C

Group D

Final Round

Club Leg

Group A

Group B

Final round

Final

References

Pakistan Football Federation League seasons
PFF
Pakistan